Golden Youth is a 2019 French drama film directed by Eva Ionesco and starring Isabelle Huppert. The film stars Galatéa Bellugi as Rose, a hard partying teenager growing up in the 1980s, whose older boyfriend introduces her to a wealthy older couple who have no sexual taboos.

Cast
 Isabelle Huppert as Lucile Wood
 Galatéa Bellugi as Rose
 Melvil Poupaud as Hubert Robert
 Lukas Ionesco as Michel
 Alain-Fabien Delon as Adrien

References

External links
 

2019 films
2019 drama films
French drama films
2010s French-language films
2010s French films